Cyperus baronii is a species of sedge that is endemic to parts of Africa.

The species was first formally described by the botanist Charles Baron Clarke in 1883.

See also
 List of Cyperus species

References

baronii
Taxa named by Charles Baron Clarke
Plants described in 1883
Flora of Cameroon
Flora of the Comoros
Flora of Liberia
Flora of Kenya
Flora of Malawi
Flora of Madagascar
Flora of Réunion
Flora of Nigeria
Flora of Tanzania
Flora of Sierra Leone